Anjatha Singam is a 1987 Indian Tamil-language film directed by M. Vijaychander for Karthik Arts. The film stars Prabhu, Sathyaraj, M. N. Nambiar, Nalini and Goundamani.

Cast 

Prabhu
Jaishankar
M. N. Nambiar
Nalini
Silk Smitha
Anuradha
Sathyaraj in a Guest appearance role
Vadivukkarasi
Senthil
Kullamani
Idichapuli Selvaraj
MLA Thangaraj

Soundtrack
Soundtrack was composed by Shankar–Ganesh.
"Thamaraiyai Vaazhthi" - Malaysia Vasudevan, Vani Jairam
"Muzhanguthu Guitar" - Malaysia Vasudevan, S. P. Sailaja

References

External links

1987 films
1980s Tamil-language films
Films scored by Shankar–Ganesh